Champagne Waltz is a 1937 American comedy film directed by A. Edward Sutherland and starring Gladys Swarthout, Fred MacMurray and Jack Oakie. It is one of five movies produced by Paramount in the 1930s featuring Swarthout, a very popular Metropolitan Opera mezzo-soprano.  The studio was attempting to build on the popularity of Grace Moore, another opera singer, who had also expanded her talents into movies. The film's sets were designed by the art director Ernst Fegté working with Hans Dreier. The costume designer was Travis Banton.

Plot
This is a light musical with elements of screwball comedy.  It documents the rivalry between a Vienna Waltz studio and the American jazz band that moves in next door.  Franz Strauss is stressed because his waltz palace is losing business to the jazz club.  Fred MacMurray is the trumpet-playing headliner.  He pretends to be the US Consul when he encounters Swarthout, the daughter of the waltz studio owner.  He changes the story to be an icebox salesman in order to continue wooing Swarthout.  Meanwhile, Oakie is falling for a countess who sold him a fake silver service.

Reception
Time gave the movie a  poor review as a "heavy-handed musical naively designed to combine the best features of jazz with those of the Viennese waltz."

Cast

 Gladys Swarthout as Elsa Strauss
 Fred MacMurray as Buzzy Bellew
 Jack Oakie as Happy Gallagher
 Frank Veloz as Larry
 Yolanda Casazza as Anna 
 Herman Bing as Max Snellinek
 Fritz Leiber as Franz Strauss
 Vivienne Osborne as Countess Mariska
 Frank Forest as Karl Lieberlich
 Ernest Cossart as Waiter
 Benny Baker as 	Flip
 James Burke as Mr. Scribner
 Maude Eburne as Mrs. Scribner
 Maurice Cass as 	Hugo
 Guy Bates Post as Lumvedder
 Michael Visaroff as Ivanovitch
 Rudolph Anders as Emperor Franz Joseph 
 Stanley Price as 	Johann Strauss 
 Tommy Bond as Otto, Singing Student
 Carol Adams as Dancer

See also

 Rose of the Rancho (1936)
 Give Us This Night (1936)
 Romance in the Dark (1938)
 Ambush (1939)

References

External links
 Champagne Waltz

1937 films
1937 musical comedy films
American musical comedy films
Films set in Vienna
Films set in the 1920s
American black-and-white films
Paramount Pictures films
Films directed by A. Edward Sutherland
1930s American films